The flag of Chita Oblast, a former federal subject of the Russian Federation, is a horizontal green and red bicolour charged with a yellow chevron (a triangle at the hoist side). It was adopted on December 22, 1995.

The flag is the same as that of Zabaykalsky Krai, which was formed when Chita Oblast and Agin-Buryat Autonomous Okrug merged on March 1, 2008.

References
Flags of the World

Flag
Flags of the federal subjects of Russia
Flags introduced in 1995
1995 establishments in Russia